Pamela Sawyer is a member of the Connecticut House of Representatives.

Biography
Sawyer was born in Providence, Rhode Island. She graduated from the University of Rhode Island.

Career
Sawyer was first elected to the House of Representatives in 1992. She is a Republican.

References

Politicians from Providence, Rhode Island
Republican Party members of the Connecticut House of Representatives
Women state legislators in Connecticut
University of Rhode Island alumni
Living people
Year of birth missing (living people)
21st-century American women